Peyo Muscarditz (born 2 January 1996) is a French rugby union player who plays for Bayonne in the Top 14 and the French national team. His position is centre.

Honours

Club 
 Bayonne
Pro D2: 2018–19

References

External links 
 Aviron Bayonnais profile

1996 births
Living people
French rugby union players
Aviron Bayonnais players
Rugby union centres
Sportspeople from Pyrénées-Atlantiques
21st-century French people